Heaton-with-Oxcliffe is a civil parish in Lancaster, Lancashire, England. It contains three listed buildings that are recorded in the National Heritage List for England, all of which are listed at Grade II.  This grade is the lowest of the three gradings given to listed buildings and is applied to "buildings of national importance and special interest".  The parish is almost entirely rural and the listed buildings consist of a house, a farmhouse and a public house.

Buildings

References

Citations

Sources

Lists of listed buildings in Lancashire
Buildings and structures in the City of Lancaster